German Valeriiovych Galushchenko, also Herman Valeriiovych Halushchenko (born 1 May 1973) is a Ukrainian lawyer currently serving as Minister of Energy of Ukraine since 29 April 2021. He is also a member of the National Security and Defense Council of Ukraine since 13 May 2021.

He has been outspoken regarding Ukraine's energy situation and the IAEA's role in the protection of the Russian-held Zaporizhzhia nuclear plant in southern Ukraine.

Career

Ministry position 
On April 29, 2021, the Verkhovna Rada of Ukraine voted to appoint Herman Halushchenko as the Minister of Energy of Ukraine. This decision was supported by 305 MPs - the Servant of the People faction, OPFL, Batkivshchyna, and the For the Future and Dovira groups.

On May 13, President Volodymyr Zelenskyy appointed Herman Halushchenko to the National Security and Defense Council of Ukraine by a decree.

Teaching activity 
Since 2012, he has been teaching private international law at the Institute of International Relations of Taras Shevchenko National University of Kyiv. Associate Professor of Private International Law at the Institute of International Relations of Taras Shevchenko National University of Kyiv.

References

Living people
1973 births
Lawyers from Lviv
Politicians from Lviv
University of Lviv alumni
Ministers of Energy of Ukraine
Independent politicians in Ukraine
Recipients of the Order of Danylo Halytsky